Max Thomas (March 24, 1874 – June 3, 1929) was an American gymnast. He competed in three events at the 1904 Summer Olympics.

References

External links
 

1874 births
1929 deaths
American male artistic gymnasts
Olympic gymnasts of the United States
Gymnasts at the 1904 Summer Olympics
Place of birth missing